Maslama ibn Yahya al-Bajali was a Khurasani Arab general and governor of the Abbasid Caliphate. 

He was the brother of Jibril ibn Yahya al-Bajali, who had probably participated in the Abbasid Revolution and hence belonged to the khurasaniyya, the new regime's main power-base. Maslama served with Salih ibn Ali in Syria against the Byzantines, and in 789 as governor of Egypt for Caliph Harun al-Rashid.

Sources 
 

8th-century births
8th-century Abbasid governors of Egypt
Generals of the Abbasid Caliphate
Abbasid governors of Egypt
Abbasid people of the Arab–Byzantine wars
Year of death unknown
8th-century Arabs